Good Morning Good Night is a collaborative album by Sachiko M, Toshimaru Nakamura, and Otomo Yoshihide.  It was released in 2004 by Erstwhile Records.

Background
The music consists of sine waves produced by a sampler, mixing console feedback, and turntable-based sounds.  The music is sparse and divided into several segments ranging from approximately 8 to 37 minutes in length.

Track listing

Personnel
Adapted from Erstwhile Records
 Sachiko M  – sine waves, sampler
 Toshimaru Nakamura –  no-input mixing board
 Otomo Yoshihide –  turntables, electronics

Reception

The album was given a 7.3 by Pitchfork, with reviewer Dominique Leone praising the album for its complexity and meticulous instrumentation.

References

Electronic albums by Japanese artists
Minimal music albums
2004 albums